Vulcan's Forge may refer to:
Vulcan's Forge (Jack Du Brul novel), a novel involving a volcano created by the USSR
Vulcan's Forge (horse), American Thoroughbred racehorse
Vulcan's Forge, a vent in the Uinkaret volcanic field in Arizona, USA